The 2019–20 TCU Horned Frogs men's basketball team represents Texas Christian University in the 2019–20 NCAA Division I men's basketball season, led by head coach Jamie Dixon in his fourth season at TCU. The Horned Frogs compete as members of the Big 12 Conference and play their home games at Schollmaier Arena in Fort Worth, Texas.

Previous season 
They finished the season 23–14, 7–11 in Big 12 play to finish in a tie for seventh place. They lost in the quarterfinals of the Big 12 tournament to Kansas State. They received an at-large bid to the NIT as the No. 1 seed where they lost in the semifinals to Texas.

Offseason

Departures

Incoming transfers

Recruits

Recruiting class of 2019

Roster

Schedule and results

|-
!colspan=9 style=| Regular season

|-
!colspan=9 style=| Big 12 tournament

Schedule Source: GoFrogs.com

References

Tcu
TCU Horned Frogs men's basketball seasons
TCU Horned Frogs men's basketball team
TCU Horned Frogs men's basketball team